Matou a Família e Foi ao Cinema (Killed His Family and Went to the Movies) is a Brazilian film directed by Júlio Bressane and released in 1969.

Plot 
The film has several related episodes in which the characters seek death as the apex for their passions.

Production 
The film was shot in 16 mm and then enlarged to 35 mm.

Remake 
A remake was made in 1991. This version was also written by Bressane but directed by Neville de Almeida.

External links 
 

1969 films
1969 drama films
Brazilian drama films
1960s Portuguese-language films